Greater palatine may refer to:

 Greater palatine artery
 Greater palatine canal
 Greater palatine foramen
 Greater palatine nerve